Brad Purdie (born July 11, 1972) is a Canadian retired professional ice hockey centre.

Born in Dollard-des-Ormeaux, Quebec, Purdie spent four seasons with the University of Maine and turned pro in 1996.  He had brief spells in the East Coast Hockey League with the Dayton Bombers and the Peoria Rivermen, and in the American Hockey League with the Cornwall Aces before spending three seasons in the International Hockey League.  He first played for the Chicago Wolves before joining the Manitoba Moose where he had an excellent season, finishing second in points with 72 behind Greg Pankewicz's 76.  He then moved to the Fort Wayne Komets where he scored 68 points and again finished second in points with Vyacheslav Butsayev leading the team with 72.

In 1999, Purdie moved to Austria and joined VSV EC where he led the team with 32 goals and 50 assists for 82 points in just 33 games.  He then moved to the Deutsche Eishockey Liga in Germany, joining the Krefeld Pinguine where he led the team in points in each of his three seasons. He had the highest number of assists while playing for Krefeld Pinguine of the German DEL. He moved to the Hamburg Freezers in 2003 where he was again the top points scorer amongst the team in his first season wit 52 points in 52 games.  But his second season with the team was a disappointment as his production declined.  In the same number of games he only managed to score 33 points.  In 2005, he moved to the Iserlohn Roosters but struggled with injuries in his two seasons with the team as they failed to make the playoffs on both occasions.

In 2007, Purdie returned to Austria and joined EHC Black Wings Linz of the Austrian Hockey League where he scored 16 goals and 37 assists for 53 points.

Since retiring from playing professional hockey in 2011, Purdie played for and now coaches the South East Prairie Thunder, a Senior 'AAA' team in Manitoba, and volunteers with the University of Manitoba Bisons.

Career statistics

References

External links

1972 births
Canadian ice hockey centres
Chicago Wolves (IHL) players
Cornwall Aces players
Dayton Bombers players
EC VSV players
EHC Black Wings Linz players
Fort Wayne Komets players
Hamburg Freezers players
Ice hockey people from Quebec
Iserlohn Roosters players
Krefeld Pinguine players
Living people
Maine Black Bears men's ice hockey players
Manitoba Moose (IHL) players
New Jersey Rockin' Rollers players
People from Dollard-des-Ormeaux
Peoria Rivermen (ECHL) players
Canadian expatriate ice hockey players in Austria
Canadian expatriate ice hockey players in Germany
NCAA men's ice hockey national champions